Brunswick railway station serves the Toxteth district of Liverpool, England, on the Northern Line of the Merseyrail network. The station serves the nearby district of Dingle and is situated on a short section of track between two tunnels, between the now in-filled Toxteth and Harrington Docks. The station also serves businesses on the Brunswick Dock estate. The residential area of Grafton Street is reached by steps or ramp from the southbound platform.

History
The original Brunswick station was opened on 1 June 1864 by the Garston and Liverpool Railway, on Sefton Street, Liverpool's southern section of the Dock Road. It was the Liverpool terminus of a new Garston and Liverpool Railway line to Liverpool.  The terminus was inconveniently outside of the city centre and after only ten years it closed on 1 March 1874 when the line was diverted and extended, mainly by tunnel, to Liverpool Central High Level railway station. A large impressive goods terminal building remained on the station site, providing a connection to the Mersey Docks Railway, giving trains direct access to the quayside at the docks. The goods terminal building was closed in the 1970s.  The original passenger station building was still standing until demolition. The mouth of the former Liverpool Overhead Railway tunnel which led to Dingle can be seen just south of the station.

The present passenger station opened in 1998, on a site close to the original station but on the through route to Merseyrail's Liverpool Central underground station. The industrial former dock buildings are served on the river side, and a small housing estate at a higher point on the other.

Facilities

The station has a 35-space car park, free of charge. The Liverpool-bound platform has a ticket office and a shelter with seats. A bridge leads over to the Hunts Cross-bound platform which has another shelter. A ramp and stairs lead upwards to the Eastern entrance. There is a cycle rack for 8 cycles and secure cycle storage for 10 cycles.

Services
On Sundays there are 2 trains per hour in each direction.

References

Bibliography

External links

 History of railway stations in Liverpool

Railway stations in Liverpool
DfT Category E stations
Former Cheshire Lines Committee stations
Railway stations in Great Britain opened in 1864
Railway stations in Great Britain closed in 1874
Railway stations opened by Railtrack
Railway stations in Great Britain opened in 1998
Railway stations served by Merseyrail